Orquesta Panorama is a band from Galicia that performs though the autonomous community and other regions throughout the Iberian Peninsula.

History
Orquesta Panorama was founded in 1988. It made its first performance that same year on the 25th of December in the municipal of O Rosal. At the time the Orquesta had eight members along with a sound team. All the musicians at the time were male and they used a van to transport the instruments along with all the members. It was not until 1993 that this band started to transform into what it is today. Manuel Garrido, otherwise known at Lito, stressed the importance of high quality sound and light systems. He also made sure that the dancers and people that played musical instruments have a greater role. Eventually they started Panorama Kids which is meant for younger children.

2016 Angel Martinez Perez scandal
Angel Martinez Perez was the agent for approximately eighty different Orquestas including Orquesta Panorama. In 2016 Angel Martinez Perez was accused of fraud in the fiscal years 2011 and 2012. He declared that the Orquestas he represented, including Orquesta Panorama, had made a total of $4 million euros those two years when the number was closer to $50 million in reality. In 2018 he was sentenced to twelve years in prison for the $8.9 million euros of income the government lost during these years. He was able to get away with this because practically everything was paid for in cash from the performances to the performers. This left as small of a paper trail as possible. The scandal left the band's future in uncertainty until it was bought by a company in Lugo for an undisclosed amount.

Current performers
Lito Garrido--singer
Mario Álvarez--singer
Natalia Méndez--singer
Daira Monzón--singer
Eli Soal--dancer
Reyna Fabiana Gutierrez-dancer
Grabiel El Menor--dancer
Issac Matos--dancer
Ismael Segura--guitarist
Jorge Ramilo Longa--bass guitarist
Carlos Oubiña--keyboardist
Alexandre Vázquez Roca--drums
Edgar Oliveros--percussionist
Roberto Ángel Hernández Rodríguez--trumpeter
Andel Labori Furones--saxophonist
Danny Méndez Esquijarosa--trumpeter
Xurxo Castro González--trombonist
Kotwey Marval--trombonist
Ivis Reyes--guitarist

Tours and Galas
2011- Planet Tour
2012- Magic Tour
2013- Remember Tour
2014- Space Tour
2015- Game Tour
2016- Happy Tour
2017- Dreams Tour
2018- Deluxe tour
Gala Contra el Cancer(Gala against Cancer) 2009- present
Gala Contra el Parkinson (Gala against Parkinson) 2016- present

References

Galician musical groups
Musical groups established in 1988